José Tous Soto (October 2, 1874 – March 22, 1933) was a Puerto Rican politician and former Senator and Representative.

Early years and education
José Tous Soto was born in San Lorenzo on October 2, 1874. He graduated with a law degree from the University of Oviedo in Spain.

Political career

Party alliance
Tous began his political career with the Liberal Fusionist Party, led by Luis Muñoz Rivera. He then joined the Republican Party.

Legislator
In 1900, he was chosen to occupy a seat in the House of Delegates of Puerto Rico, representing the district of Guayama. In 1914, he was elected for another term, this time representing the district of Ponce.

In 1917, Tous was a member of the first Puerto Rican Senate established by the Jones-Shafroth Act. He represented the District VI (Guayama).

Served as Speaker of the Puerto Rico House of Representatives from 1925 to 1930.

When the Campbell Project was presented in 1922, Tous opposed to it. The project offered Puerto Rico the possible development of an autonomous state.

Leadership in the Alianza
He continued serving at the Senate, until 1924. That year, Tous and Antonio Barceló, then Senate president, led a merging of the Republican Party with the opposing Union of Puerto Rico, forming Alianza Puertorriqueña. The merging came as a means to unify the efforts of the politicians legislating in favor of better conditions for Puerto Ricans. As a result, Tous became a member of the House of Representatives while Barceló continued in the Senate.

Death
Tous Soto died on March 22, 1933.

References

1874 births
1933 deaths
People from San Lorenzo, Puerto Rico
Members of the Senate of Puerto Rico
Speakers of the House of Representatives of Puerto Rico
Republican Party (Puerto Rico) politicians
University of Oviedo alumni